Sembunyi: Amukan Azazil is a 2013 Malaysian horror film directed by Kabir Bhatia.

Plot
Aishah is a Malay girl. During the Japanese Invasion of Malaya, she is knocked unconscious as she attempts to escape from invading Japanese soldiers. She wakes up in a strange silent town which seems to be unaffected by the invasion. The townsmen provide her with shelter, and she starts a new life. Soon she realises that there are other secrets being concealed by the town, such as a mysterious devil woods outside the town, and a demon called Azazil that preys on the villagers.

Cast
 Diana Danielle as Aishah
 Remy Ishak as Kamal
 Umie Aida as Ibu Yani
 Sharnaaz Ahmad as Atan
 Fizo Omar as Ahmad
 Shukri Yahaya as Salleh
 Emelda Rosmila as Melur
 Sara Ali as Hanum
 Aznah Hamid as Hanum (Old)
 Kismah Johar as Ummi (Old)
 Razib Salimin as Azazil

Special appearance
 Sheila Rusly as Mysterious woman

References

External links
 

2013 horror films
Genies in film
Films set in Malaysia
Malaysian horror films
2013 films
Filmscape films
Primeworks Studios films
Films directed by Kabir Bhatia
Films with screenplays by Kabir Bhatia